The Riksdag is the national legislature of Sweden. However, when it was founded in 1866 Sweden did not have a parliamentary system of government.

The national legislatures of Estonia and Finland are also called Riksdag in Swedish.

The Old Riksdag 

The precursor to the modern Riksdag was the Riksdag of the Estates. Of ancient origin in the Viking Things, the 1435 meeting in the city of Arboga is considered the first Riksdag, however only three of the estates were probably present the nobility, the clergy and the burghers. This informal representation was formalized in 1527 by King Gustav I of Sweden to include representatives of all the four estates, which historically reflected the lines of division in Swedish society: the nobility, the clergy, the burghers and the peasantry. Under the Instrument of Government of 1809 the Riksdag shared the powers of government with the King.

The New Riksdag 
On the basis of the 1863 electoral reform bill the Estates voted in 1866 to dissolve the Riksdag of the Estates and establish a new Riksdag. The new Riksdag was a political assembly with two chambers where the members were chosen in national elections.

The revolution was that citizens could participate and vote in the elections without regard to which Estate they had hitherto belonged; instead there were new requirements on income or wealth, i.e. census suffrage. Despite the fundamental change in the principles of representation, the social composition of the Riksdag did not alter by much, and the system of government had not changed. Under the Constitution of 1809 the Riksdag still divided the powers of government with the King.

Democracy emerges 
From the second half of the 19th century, when the Riksdag was founded, until the early 20th century, Swedish society underwent a number of fundamental changes that impacted on the political system. Political demands, but also sheer economic progress, increased the share of citizens eligible to vote and have a direct influence on the political system. This in turn also sponsored the emergence and growth of political parties. The Riksdag had also been able to assert itself against the Royal authority and a de facto parliamentary system had begun to emerge. As of the general election in 1921, universal and equal franchise was introduced for men and women alike, and the Riksdag finally achieved a system of democratic representation for all citizens who were at least 23 years old on election day.

The last time the king attempted to exercise political authority was in February 1914 when King Gustav V delivered a speech to 30,000 peasants, assembled on the yard of the Royal Castle in Stockholm, an action which precipitated the fall the incumbent liberal cabinet, headed by Prime Minister Karl Staaff. In the face of popular unrest and gains for Liberals and Socialists in general elections 1917 the King hesitantly accepted to appoint a new Cabinet in accordance with the principles of Parliamentarism. The new government's main task was to present bills on democratization. The voting franchise had been extended to all adult males in 1907 and women's suffrage gave them the same rights in 1921. By this Sweden had established a democratic and parliamentary system of government.

Constitutional reform 

In the 1960s debates intensified over constitutional reform in Sweden. The fundamental question was over the system of government. Even though a de facto parliamentary system was firmly established, somewhat similar to the situation in the United Kingdom, there were demands for a more democratic constitution. One of the main issues was whether the monarchy would survive constitutional reform and this blocked the issue for a long time.

Effective from 1970 a reform of the Riksdag had been agreed upon. Though not technically part of the constitution it showed that the parties in the Riksdag were able to agree upon fundamental changes of the political system, which transformed the Riksdag from a bicameral legislature into a unicameral one. This would have 350 seats, all of which would be filled by direct election. However, the second general election to the unicameral Riksdag only gave the government support from 175 members, while the opposition could mobilize an equal force of 175 members, resulting in what became known as the "lottery Riksdag", in which the Speaker had to draw lots to resolve deadlocked votes. In 1974 it was decided that the number of seats from 1977 were to be reduced to 349.

Present 
In 1974 a new Instrument of Government was established as a vital part of the Constitution and for the system of government. The monarchy was retained, whereas the monarch lost all formal political influence and became only a symbolic head of state. Several of the traditional head-of-state functions have instead been transferred to the Speaker of the Riksdag.

See also 
Government of Sweden
Politics of Sweden
Riksdagsmusiken

References

External links 
The history of the Riksdag

Riksdag
Political history of Sweden